Ochlandra is a genus of Indian bamboo in the grass family).

The species are endemic to the Western Ghats (India), except for one species from Sri Lanka.

Species

Formerly included
see Cathariostachys Nastus Schizostachyum Valiha 
 Ochlandra capitata - Cathariostachys capitata
 Ochlandra elegantissima - Nastus elegantissimus
 Ochlandra perrieri - Valiha perrieri
 Ochlandra ridleyi - Schizostachyum latifolium

References

Bambusoideae
Bambusoideae genera
Flora of the Indian subcontinent